Fum or FUM may refer to:
 Fum language
 Thurman "Fum" McGraw (1927–2000), American football player

 Friends United Meeting
 Ferdowsi University of Mashhad, in Iran
 Fermi–Ulam model
 Fire use module
 Funds under management